Sancreed Parish Church is the parish church of Sancreed, Cornwall, England, UK. It is an Anglican church in the Diocese of Truro.

Sancreed Parish church (Grade II Listed) lies at the heart of the village and is dedicated to St Sancredus. The church is built of granite, parts of which date back to the 13th and 14th-centuries which was originally built in a cruciform shape. The current church has an unbuttressed west tower of two stages, a north transept and a 15th-century south aisle of five bays. Features of interest include the fine font which is of the St Ives type dating from the 14th-century and the rood screen which has curious carvings at the base.

Much of the church was restored in 1881 by the architect J D Sedding and the contractor, Mr Bone of Liskeard. A report in The Cornishman newspaper stated, There was nothing striking about the old Church except its hoary and depressing appearance. It contained a few pieces of good carved work, which doubtless will be utilized in the restoration, but very few other specimens of art. The churchyard and church have, within the late 19th and first part of the 20th-century, made a strong appeal to painters of the Newlyn School of Art, some of whom worshipped regularly at the church and are buried in the churchyard (including Stanhope Forbes RA).

Work on replacing the church roof began in 2017 following a grant from the Heritage Lottery Fund of £227,100 and more than £11,000 from charities.

References

Church of England church buildings in Cornwall
Grade II listed churches in Cornwall
Penwith